The Alexander Briggs House is a historic house located at 210 Jackson St. in Charleston, Illinois. Prominent local stonemason Alexander Briggs built the stone house in 1894; it is the only stone house remaining in Coles County. The house's design incorporates features of the Italianate and Renaissance Revival styles; the combination is unusual, as the Renaissance Revival style was rarely used in small houses. Briggs built the house with multicolored sandstone and used marble and granite to form decorative belt courses and quoins, giving the house its Renaissance Revival appearance. The house's Italianate elements include its tall, narrow arched windows and its gently sloping roof.

The house was added to the National Register of Historic Places on May 31, 1980.

References

Houses on the National Register of Historic Places in Illinois
Italianate architecture in Illinois
Renaissance Revival architecture in Illinois
Houses completed in 1894
National Register of Historic Places in Coles County, Illinois
Houses in Coles County, Illinois